Sandø may refer to:

, an island on the Coastline of Norway
Sandø, an old name for Sande municipality, Møre og Romsdal, Norway
Sandø, an old name for Sandøy municipality, Møre og Romsdal, Norway

See also
Sandor (disambiguation)
Sandøya (disambiguation), including Sandoy
Sand Island (disambiguation)